Samo Chalupka (27 February 1812, Horná Lehota, Brezno District – 19 May 1883, Horná Lehota) was a Slovak Lutheran priest and romantic poet.

Life 
Samo Chalupka was a younger brother of Ján Chalupka, another Slovak writer. Samo studied at the Evangelical Lutheran Lyceum in Bratislava and also in Vienna. He studied theology and philosophy. When an uprising against Russia broke out in Poland in 1830, Samo Chalupka interrupted his long studies and fought on the Polish side. He was injured in 1831 and returned to Bratislava. He was the oldest member of the Ľudovít Štúr generation of the Slovak national revival. He was one of the founders and active members of the Czech-Slovak Society.

Creation 
He started writing in the so-called Czech biblical language while studying at lyceum in Bratislava. His debut poems were published in the almanac Plody (Fruit), in 1836. His works includes themes such as Slovak nature, patriotism and loyalty to his homeland and people. He often used Slovak folk songs in his works. In the 1840s, he joined the Slovak national revival led by Ľudovít Štúr because he wanted to codify the language of his nation. His first poem compilation Spevy (Vocals, 1868) was about this topic.

Works

Poetry 
1829 - Repertorium dispositionum
1834 - Koníku moj vraný  Heje
1834 - Nářek slovenský
1834 - Píseň vojenská
1864 - Mor ho!
1868 - Spevy:
Likavský väzeň (original Jánošíkova náumka)
Kráľoholská
Branko
Kozák (original Syn vojny)
Turčín Poničan
Boj pri Jelšave
Odboj Kupov
Vojenská
Juhoslovanom
Bolo i bude
Večer pod Tatrou
Při návratu do vlasti
Smutek
Toužba po vlasti
Má vlast

Translations 
 1843 - Pálenka otrava, translation of Heinrich Zschokke Brandweinpest

References

External links 
 

1812 births
1883 deaths
People from Brezno District
People from the Kingdom of Hungary
Slovak Lutherans
Slovak poets
19th-century poets
19th-century Lutherans